Phạm Thành Lương (born September 10, 1988) is a Vietnamese footballer who plays as an attacking midfielder for Hà Nội in V.League 1. He was the former captain of the Vietnam national under-23 football team. A skillful player, he is given the name "Lương Dị" by supporters.

Club career
In 2005, he led his club to the final of the National U-21 Football Championship. After that Lương was chosen to play in the first team of Hà Nội ACB.

In 2008, he was linked to move to Thể Công but it was rejected. Later that year, he won the Young Player of the Year award, Young Player of Asia in 2009

After Hà Nội F.C. folded in 2012, he moved to rival Hà Nội T&T.

International career
Lương was the member of the squad that won the 2008 AFF Suzuki Cup. On December 8, 2008, he scored his first goal for the national team against Malaysia national football team in the tournament. Two days later, he scored a goal against Laos in the 4–0 win. He captained the U-23 Vietnam to win the silver medal at the 2009 Southeast Asian Games. His performance in the tournament was seen by the Vietnamese press and he was awarded the Vietnamese Golden Ball.
Lương announced his retirement from Vietnam National team after being eliminated by Indonesia in the 2nd leg of AFF Suzuki Cup 2016 Semi Final.

International goals
Scores and results list Vietnam's goal tally first.

Under-19

Under-23

Vietnam

Honours

Hà Nội ACB
V.League 2: 2010; Runners-up: 2009
Vietnamese National Cup: 2006, 2008
Vietnamese Super Cup: Runner-up: 2008
Hà Nội
V.League 1: 2013, 2016, 2018, 2019, 2022; Runners-up : 2014, 2015, 2020
Vietnamese National Cup: 2019, 2020, 2022; Runner-up: 2015, 2016
Vietnamese Super Cup: 2019, 2020, 2021; Runners-up: 2014, 2016, 2017
Vietnam U23
Southeast Asian Games: Runners-up 2009
VFF Cup: 2009; Runners-up 2011
Vietnam
AFF Championship: 2008
VFF Cup: Runners-up 2008

Individuals
 Vietnamese Golden Ball: 2009, 2011, 2014, 2016
 Vietnamese Silver Ball: 2010
 Best Young Player of Vietnam Football Federation: 2010, 2011
 Best player of the Vietnamese U21 National Championship: 2005
 Team of the tournament (Best XI) ASEAN Football Championship: 2014

External links 
 
 

1988 births
Living people
Sportspeople from Hanoi
Vietnamese footballers
Association football midfielders
Vietnam international footballers
V.League 1 players
Hanoi FC players
Footballers at the 2010 Asian Games
Southeast Asian Games silver medalists for Vietnam
Southeast Asian Games medalists in football
Competitors at the 2009 Southeast Asian Games
Asian Games competitors for Vietnam